The Outsyders  was a production team from Atlanta, Georgia, which consisted of Dean Beresford (Deaneaux), Kamran Main (KAM), Ervin Ward (Wiz Kid), and Rapheal Akinyemi (Ro.A). Their writing and production talents were first featured on "Womanizer," from Britney Spears' sixth studio album Circus. The single was officially released on September 26, 2008, and peaked at No. 1 on the Billboard Hot 100 on October 15, 2008, setting a new record on the Billboard Hot 100 making a near-maximum 96-1 rise. The team also received a grammy for the 2009 Grammy Awards in the category of Best Dance Recording. The group was featured on "Oh-Oh, Yeah-Yea" from Keyshia Cole's 2008 album A Different Me and more.

Production Discography

2008

Britney Spears - Circus
 01. "Womanizer"

Keyshia Cole - A Different Me
 07. "Oh-Oh, Yeah-Yea" (featuring Nas)

2009

Cobra Starship - Hot Mess
 01. "Nice Guys Finish Last"

Jay-Z - The Blueprint 3
 01. "Reminder"

References

Record production teams
Songwriting teams